Wax leaf privet is a common name for several plants and may refer to:

Ligustrum japonicum, native to Japan and Korea
Ligustrum lucidum, native to China
Ligustrum quihoui, native to Korea and China